The Pursuit of D. B. Cooper is a 1981 American crime thriller film about infamous aircraft hijacker D. B. Cooper, who escaped with $200,000 after leaping from the back of a Boeing 727 airliner on November 24, 1971. The bulk of the film fictionalizes Cooper's escape after he landed on the ground.

Plot
On a clear day in 1971, the hijacker identified as D.B. Cooper jumps from an airliner by using the rear exit, parachuting into a forest in Washington State. The man is later identified as Jim Meade, a military veteran with big dreams. Meade escapes the manhunt using a Jeep that he had previously hidden in the forest and concealing the money that he has stolen in the carcass of a deer. He meets his estranged wife Hannah, who operates a river rafting company. Meade is being hunted by Bill Gruen, an insurance investigator who was Meade's army sergeant, and Meade's army buddy Remson, who remembered Meade talking about hijacking an aircraft.

Gruen confronts the Meades at the rafting company, but they escape down the river. The Meades lead Gruen and Remson on a cross-country chase involving various stolen cars. Gruen is fired by his employer but continues the chase to claim the money for himself. At the aircraft boneyard near Tucson, Arizona, the Meades acquire a hot-air balloon, but Gruen steals the money from Hannah. Meade chases him with a barely functional Boeing-Stearman PT-17 cropduster biplane. Meade runs Gruen off the road but crashes his aircraft.

Recovering from the wrecks, Meade has Gruen's gun and for a few minutes, they discuss how Gruen knew that Meade was D. B. Cooper. Along with clues that he had left, the previous encounters between the two men in the army had convinced Gruen that only Meade could have managed the audacious hijacking.

Meade leaves Gruen with a few bundles of the cash and walks away with the rest, to be picked up by Hannah. With Gruen abandoning the pursuit, Remson must try to recover the stolen money. When he reaches a crossroads that the Meades have just passed, Remson thinks that he sees their truck parked nearby and continues the chase.

Cast

 Robert Duvall as Sgt. Bill Gruen
 Treat Williams as D.B. Cooper/Jim Meade
 Kathryn Harrold as Hannah Meade
 Ed Flanders as Brigadier Meade
 Paul Gleason as Remson
 R.G. Armstrong as Dempsey
 Dorothy Fielding as Denise
 Nicolas Coster as Avery
 Cooper Huckabee as Homer
 Howard K. Smith as Howard K. Smith
 Christopher Curry as Hippie

Production
The Pursuit of D. B. Cooper was based on American poet J.D. Reed's 1980 novel Free Fall: A Novel.

Jeffrey Alan Fiskin wrote the original script. John Frankenheimer was the original director, but he was replaced by Buzz Kulik after shooting one sequence, and Kulik finished the film. W.D. Richter worked on the script uncredited, as only Jeffrey Allan Fiskin was awarded credit.

The producers then asked editor-director Roger Spottiswoode to shoot a major new stunt and edit the film. Spottiswoode argued that the film was "doomed" unless he could shoot new sequences, to be written by Ron Shelton, who would be credited as an associate producer. The Spottiswood-Shelton scenes comprise approximately 70% of the finished film.

According to one writer, the new team "added new characters - a rural rogue's gallery of scam artists - and an end-of-the-hippie era feeling. Even when editing the existing material, the new writer and director changed the film thematically, dramatically, cinematically."

The Kulik film was a "banal, dour Vietnam vet docudrama" in which Meade concocts the scheme to escape postwar malaise and becomes upset when he wins the acclaim as a hijacker that had eluded him as a veteran. The Shelton-Spotiswoode film was more of a chase comedy "about a man who returns home and plans to get himself the easy money that's part of the American dream for him and for all the low-lifes he meets along the way (including a Nam comrade who returns to haunt Meade like a comic Javert)."

Kathryn Harrold later said: "It was a little tricky knowing what was going to happen without a script".

To generate publicity for the film, Universal Pictures offered a million-dollar reward for any information that would lead to the capture and arrest of the real D.B. Cooper, but no one ever claimed the money.

Aircraft in the film
A Boeing 727-173C (c/n 19504-527, N690WA) leased from World Airways was used in the film as the hijacked Northwest Orient Airlines Boeing 727. Painted in the fictitious Northern Pacific company livery, it appears in the first scene, photographed by pilot Clay Lacy from his Learjet. Four professional parachutists performed the jump from the rear exit stairs of the Boeing 727.

Other aircraft in the film included wrecks found at Davis–Monthan Air Force Base, including twin-engine and four-engine propeller aircraft such as the Douglas C-47 Skytrain, Lockheed P2V Neptune, Lockheed C-121 Constellation and Douglas C-54 Skymaster. Numerous Sikorsky H-34 and Sikorsky CH-37 Mojave helicopters were also featured. A Boeing-Stearman PT-17 (s/n 41 25304, N56949) flown by Art Scholl was used in the climatic car-aircraft chase in the film.

Soundtrack
The musical score includes the song "Shine," written and sung by Waylon Jennings and also released on Jennings' 1982 album Black on Black. A soundtrack album was released by Polydor Records (PD-1-6344) consisting mostly of country songs.

Track listing

Reception
The Pursuit of D. B. Cooper, although similar to other hijacking films of the period, was not a success at the box office. In a critical review of the film, Vincent Canby of The New York Times noted that "... a number of excellent actors (were coerced) into performing what is a dismally unfunny chase-comedy that eventually seems as aimless, shortsighted and cheerlessly cute as the character they've made up and called 'D.B. Cooper'."

In 1982, original director John Frankenheimer described the film as "... probably my worst-ever experience. A key member in the chain of command had been lying to both management and myself with the result that we all thought we were making a different movie."

Roger Spottiswoode won the Special Jury Prize at the 1982 Cognac Festival du Film Policier.

See also
D. B. Cooper in popular culture

References

Notes

Citations

Bibliography

 Paris, Michael. From the Wright Brothers to Top Gun: Aviation, Nationalism, and Popular Cinema. Manchester, UK: Manchester University Press, 1995. .
 Reed, J.D. Free Fall: A Novel. New York: Delacorte Press, 1980.

External links
 
 
 

1981 films
1980s crime thriller films
American crime thriller films
American aviation films
American heist films
American chase films
Films about aircraft hijackings
American films based on actual events
Films based on American novels
Films directed by Roger Spottiswoode
Films scored by James Horner
Films set in Washington (state)
Films set on airplanes
PolyGram Filmed Entertainment films
Universal Pictures films
1980s English-language films
1980s American films